is a Japanese voice actress and singer from Hokkaido. She is affiliated with IAM Agency. She is known for her roles as Mari Ohara in Love Live! Sunshine!! and Jashin-chan in Dropkick on My Devil!, as well as her activities as a member of the idol group Aqours.

Career
Aina Suzuki had hoped to work in anime since her elementary school days, but thought her voice might not be good enough. A turning point came when, in her 3rd year of high school, she became a finalist (and one of the best 3 in the nationals) of the 7th All-Japan Anisong Grand Prix. At that time, her desire to become an anisong singer intensified and she made it her goal. She moved to Tokyo as soon as she had graduated from high school. She later revealed that, if she would have won the Anisong Grand Prix, she would have had her major debut the next year (2014) and would have been able to participate in a tournament to be held at the Yokohama Arena; this was revealed in February 2017, after the success of Aqours 1st LoveLive which incidentally had a leg performed in Yokohama Arena.

After arriving in Tokyo, Aina entered the International Media Institute (a voice actor training center associated with IAM Agency). While she had fun in her training and found it rewarding, there were still times when she was unconfident in her vocal abilities. However, after some encouragement from Ryo Horikawa (chief director of the institute) she started to have more confidence. This reignited her desire to become an anisong singer and voice actress after arriving in Tokyo. 

She affiliated herself with IAM Agency to learn from both vocalists and voice actors. She made her voice acting debut in 2014. In 2015, she got a role in the Love Live! franchise's then new series, Love Live! Sunshine!! as Mari Ohara, and her activities as a member of Aqours began. 

In March 2017, she and the other members of Aqours received a singing award in the 11th Voice Actor Awards.

On January 22, 2020, her solo debut album, 「ring A ring」, was released. She played the role of Kana Hoshisato in the anime series Hatena Illusion, where she also performed the series' ending theme . She launched her official fanclub, "Ai catwalk", on the same day.

Filmography

Anime television series

OVA/ONA

Film animation

Games

Drama CD

Digital comic

Web radio

Discography

Studio albums

Singles

References

External links
 Official website 
 Official agency profile 
 

1995 births
Living people
Anime singers
Aqours members
Japanese women pop singers
Japanese video game actresses
Japanese voice actresses
People from Chitose, Hokkaido
Voice actresses from Hokkaido
Singers from Hokkaido
21st-century Japanese actresses
21st-century Japanese singers
21st-century Japanese women singers